Gene mapping describes the methods used to identify the locus of a gene and the distances between genes.  Gene mapping can also describe the distances between different sites within a gene.

The essence of all genome mapping is to place a collection of molecular markers onto their respective positions on the genome. Molecular markers come in all forms. Genes can be viewed as one special type of genetic markers in the construction of genome maps, and mapped the same way as any other markers. In some areas of study, gene mapping contributes to the creation of new recombinants within an organism.

Genetic vs physical 
There are two distinctive types of "maps" used in the field of genome mapping: genetic maps and physical maps. While both maps are a collection of genetic markers and gene loci, genetic maps' distances are based on the genetic linkage information, while physical maps use actual physical distances usually measured in number of base pairs. While the physical map could be a more "accurate" representation of the genome, genetic maps often offer insights into the nature of different regions of the chromosome, e.g. the genetic distance to physical distance ratio varies greatly at different genomic regions which reflects different recombination rates, and such rate is often indicative of euchromatic (usually gene-rich) vs heterochromatic (usually gene poor) regions of the genome.

Gene 
Researchers begin a genetic map by collecting samples of blood, saliva, or tissue from family members that carry a prominent disease or trait and family members that don't. The most common sample used in gene mapping, especially in personal genomic tests is saliva. Scientists then isolate DNA from the samples and closely examine it, looking for unique patterns in the DNA of the family members who do carry the disease and the DNA of those who don't carry the disease don't have. These unique molecular patterns in the DNA are referred to as polymorphisms, or markers.

The first steps of building a genetic map are the development of genetic markers and a mapping population. The closer two markers are on the chromosome, the more likely they are to be passed on to the next generation together. Therefore, the "co-segregation" patterns of all markers can be used to reconstruct their order. With this in mind, the genotypes of each genetic marker are recorded for both parents and each individual in the following generations. The quality of the genetic maps is largely dependent upon these factors: the number of genetic markers on the map and the size of the mapping population. The two factors are interlinked, as a larger mapping population could increase the "resolution" of the map and prevent the map from being "saturated".

In gene mapping, any sequence feature that can be faithfully distinguished from the two parents can be used as a genetic marker. Genes, in this regard, are represented by "traits" that can be faithfully distinguished between two parents. Their linkage with other genetic markers is calculated in the same way as if they are common markers and the actual gene loci are then bracketed in a region between the two nearest neighboring markers. The entire process is then repeated by looking at more markers that target that region to map the gene neighborhood to a higher resolution until a specific causative locus can be identified. This process is often referred to as "positional cloning", and it is used extensively in the study of plant species. One plant species, in particular in which positional cloning is utilized is in maize. The great advantage of genetic mapping is that it can identify the relative position of genes based solely on their phenotypic effect.

Genetic mapping is a way to identify exactly which chromosome has which gene and exactly pinpointing where that gene lies on that particular chromosome. Mapping also acts as a method in determining which gene is most likely to recombine based on the distance between two genes. The distance between two genes is measured in units known as centimorgan or map units, these terms are interchangeable. A centimorgan is a distance between genes for which one product of meiosis in one hundred is recombinant. The further two genes are from each other, the more likely they are going to recombine. If it were closer, the opposite would occur.

Physical mapping
Since actual base-pair distances are generally hard or impossible to directly measure, physical maps are actually constructed by first shattering the genome into hierarchically smaller pieces. By characterizing each single piece and assembling back together, the overlapping path or "tiling path" of these small fragments would allow researchers to infer physical distances between genomic features. The fragmentation of the genome can be achieved by restriction enzyme cutting or by physically shattering the genome by processes like sonication. Once cut, the DNA fragments are separated by electrophoresis. The resulting pattern of DNA migration (i.e. its genetic fingerprint) is used to identify what stretch of DNA is in the clone. By analyzing the fingerprints, contigs are assembled by automated (FPC) or manual means (pathfinders) into overlapping DNA stretches. Now a good choice of clones can be made to efficiently sequence the clones to determine the DNA sequence of the organism under study.

In physical mapping, there are no direct ways of marking up a specific gene since the mapping does not include any information that concerns traits and functions. Genetic markers can be linked to a physical map by processes like in situ hybridization. By this approach, physical map contigs can be "anchored" onto a genetic map. The clones used in the physical map contigs can then be sequenced on a local scale to help new genetic marker design and identification of the causative loci.

Macrorestriction is a type of physical mapping wherein the high molecular weight DNA is digested with a restriction enzyme having a low number of restriction sites.

There are alternative ways to determine how DNA in a group of clones overlaps without completely sequencing the clones. Once the map is determined, the clones can be used as a resource to efficiently contain large stretches of the genome. This type of mapping is more accurate than genetic maps.

Mapping of mutational sites within a gene

In the early 1950s the prevailing view was that the genes in a chromosome are discrete entities, indivisible by genetic recombination and arranged like beads on a string.  During 1955 to 1959, Benzer performed genetic recombination experiments using rII mutants of bacteriophage T4.  He found that, on the basis of recombination tests, the sites of mutation could be mapped in a linear order. This result provided evidence for the key idea that the gene has a linear structure equivalent to a length of DNA with many sites that can independently mutate.

In 1961, Francis Crick, Leslie Barnett, Sydney Brenner and Richard Watts-Tobin performed genetic experiments that demonstrated the basic nature of the genetic code for proteins. These experiments, involving mapping of mutational sites within the rIIB gene of bacteriophage T4, demonstrated that three sequential nucleobases of the gene's DNA specify each successive amino acid of its encoded protein. Thus the genetic code was shown to be a triplet code, where each triplet (called a codon) specifies a particular amino acid. They also obtained evidence that the codons do not overlap with each other in the DNA sequence encoding a protein, and that such a sequence is read from a fixed starting point.

Edgar et al. performed mapping experiments with r mutants of bacteriophage T4 showing that recombination frequencies between rII mutants are not strictly additive. The recombination frequency from a cross of two rII mutants (a x d) is usually less than the sum of recombination frequencies for adjacent internal sub-intervals (a x b) + (b x c) + (c x d). Although not strictly additive, a systematic relationship was demonstrated that likely reflects the underlying molecular mechanism of genetic recombination.

Genome sequencing
Genome sequencing is sometimes mistakenly referred to as "genome mapping" by non-biologists. The process of "shotgun sequencing" resembles the process of physical mapping: it shatters the genome into small fragments, characterizes each fragment, then puts them back together (more recent sequencing technologies are drastically different). While the scope, purpose and process are totally different, a genome assembly can be viewed as the "ultimate" form of physical map, in that it provides in a much better way all the information that a traditional physical map can offer.

Use
Identification of genes is usually the first step in understanding a genome of a species; mapping of the gene is usually the first step of identification of the gene. Gene mapping is usually the starting point of many important downstream studies.

Disease association
The process to identify a genetic element that is responsible for a disease is also referred to as "mapping". If the locus in which the search is performed is already considerably constrained, the search is called the fine mapping of a gene. This information is derived from the investigation of disease manifestations in large families (genetic linkage) or from populations-based genetic association studies.

See also 

 Eukaryotic chromosome fine structure 
 Fluorescence in situ hybridization
 G banding
 Gene map
 Genetic fingerprinting
 Genetic linkage
 Genome project
 Human Genome Project
 Optical mapping
 Quantitative trait locus
 Sulston score

References

Further reading

External links 

Genetics